Poliosia punctivena is a moth in the family Erebidae. It was described by George Hampson in 1898. It is found in Sikkim, India.

References

Moths described in 1898
Lithosiina